Culladia serranella is a moth in the family Crambidae. It was described by Stanisław Błeszyński in 1970. It is found in South Africa.

References

Endemic moths of South Africa
Crambini
Moths described in 1970
Moths of Africa